Erik Tønne (born 3 July 1991) is a Norwegian professional footballer who plays as a winger for Ranheim.

Tønne began his playing career as a youngster with Nardo, Rosenborg and Strindheim in his native Norway before moving to England to sign for Sheffield United in 2011. He has also had loan spells at York City and HamKam.

Career

Early career in Norway
Born in Trondheim, Sør-Trøndelag, Tønne started his career with Nardo before joining Rosenborg's youth system in 2006. He was released by Rosenborg at his own request after two years at the club and subsequently joined Strindheim. At Strindheim he was the team's top scorer two seasons running as a left back.

Sheffield United
Tønne undertook a trial with English Championship club Sheffield United during September 2010 before signing a permanent deal in February 2011 as part of the club's development squad. After impressing in the reserve team he was called up to the first team squad and eventually made his debut on 9 April 2011, coming on as an 86th minute substitute against Middlesbrough in a 2–1 home defeat. He finished the 2010–11 season, his first in senior football, with two appearances as United were relegated to League One.

Tønne's first goal for United came when he scored in the 79th minute against League Two side Burton Albion in the Football League Trophy first round on 30 August with a strike from outside the penalty area, which proved to be the winning goal in a 2–1 victory. He then scored his first league goal for United a few days later with a fine volley to cap off a 4–0 victory against Bury, which he described as "something special". Having established himself on the fringes of the first team Tønne signed a contract extension in January 2012 to keep him at United until the summer of 2014, and was subsequently loaned to Conference Premier side York City until the end of the 2011–12 season. He made his debut in a 1–0 victory at home to Ebbsfleet United in the FA Trophy third round on 14 February 2012, and scored his only goal for York with the winner away at Braintree Town in a 1–0 victory on 21 April, a result that confirmed York's place in the play-offs. He took no part in the play-offs, which York won to earn promotion to League Two, finishing his loan with four appearances and one goal.

Tønne did not feature for United the following season and in March 2013 he was allowed to return to Norway for a trial with HamKam, and was subsequently signed an eight-month loan deal with the club. He made his debut in HamKam's opening game of the 2013 season, a 2–2 home draw with Stabæk on 6 April 2013.

Sandnes Ulf
On 8 August 2013 it was confirmed that Tønne had been recalled from his loan at HamKam so that he could sign for Sandnes Ulf in the Tippeligaen on a permanent basis, thus ending his career with Sheffield United.

Tønne made his debut, coming on as a 57th-minute substitute for Marius Helle against Tromsø on 11 August 2013, when his new teammates won 2–1 at home.

Career statistics

References

External links

1991 births
Living people
Footballers from Trondheim
Norwegian footballers
Norwegian expatriate footballers
Association football wingers
Rosenborg BK players
Strindheim IL players
Sheffield United F.C. players
York City F.C. players
Hamarkameratene players
Sandnes Ulf players
FK Bodø/Glimt players
Fredrikstad FK players
Levanger FK players
Ranheim Fotball players
English Football League players
National League (English football) players
Norwegian First Division players
Eliteserien players
Expatriate footballers in England
Norwegian expatriate sportspeople in England